Thomas Jeff Knight is an American country music artist, sometimes credited as T.J. Knight. Born in El Paso, Texas, he later moved to the Allegheny Mountains region of Pennsylvania; after finding work as a truck driver, he moved to Nashville, Tennessee, where he signed to a publishing contract with a publishing company known as Music of the World. Among the artists who cut his songs are Pirates of the Mississippi, Johnny Cash, Clay Walker, and Vince Gill.

Knight was signed to a recording contract with Polygram Records/Mercury Records in 1992. He released two albums for the label and released four singles. He also wrote Daryle Singletary's 1996 single "Too Much Fun", for which Knight won a BMI award.

They've Been Talkin' About Me

Track listing
"Tearing Down Walls" (Rich Alves, T. J. Knight, Jerry Taylor) – 3:43
"You Gotta Let Go (Alves, Knight, Taylor) – 3:02
"They've Been Talkin' About Me" (Knight) – 3:15
"I Wish She Didn't Know Me" (Knight) – 3:25
"All I Think About Is You" (Knight) – 2:44
"The Bitter End" (Alves, Knight, Taylor) – 2:44
"I Got Through Everything (But the Door)" (Knight, Charlie Williams) – 3:22
"Someone Like You" (Alves, Knight, Taylor) – 2:31
"Gettin' in to Goin' Out" (Knight, Curtis Wright) – 2:54
"Everybody's Doin' It" (Knight) – 2:10

Easy Street

Track listing

"Easy Street" (T. J. Knight, Curtis Wright) – 3:37
"The Wheels Just Keep on Turnin'" (Knight) – 3:26
"Someday You'll Love Me" (Even Stevens, Hillary Kanter) – 3:33
"What're You Doin' After Him" (Knight, Wright) – 3:42
"You're Gonna Fall" (Knight) – 3:13
"Gettin' Down in San Antone" (Knight) – 2:27
"True Love Stands Alone" (Sam Hogin, Jeff Borders, Randy Boudreaux) – 2:53
"Wasn't That a Good Time" (Knight, Bob Merrill) – 2:49
"4-Wheel Drive" (Knight, Gerry House) – 2:55
"People Sure Are Hard to Keep" (Knight) – 3:29

Chart Performance

Singles

Music videos

Chart Singles written by Jeff Knight

The following is a list of Jeff Knight compositions that were chart hits.

References

External links
[ They've Been Talking About Me] at Allmusic
[ Easy Street] at Allmusic

American country singer-songwriters
Living people
Mercury Records artists
Musicians from El Paso, Texas
Year of birth missing (living people)
Singer-songwriters from Texas
Country musicians from Texas